Kawungan is a suburb of Hervey Bay in the Fraser Coast Region, Queensland, Australia. In the  Kawungan had a population of 4,816 people.

Geography 
The northern part of the suburb is used for residential purposes while the southern part of the suburb, which is on the current urban edge of Hervey Bay's development, is partly residential and partly farmland, used for grazing on native vegetation.

History
The suburb was officially named and bounded by Queensland Place Names Board on 1 September 1980. Kawungan is reported to be from the Kabi language word, with kai wung referring to the scrub magpie (Strepera graculina) and dha/gun meaning place, thus place of the scrub magpie.

Hervey Bay Special School opened on 11 March 1986.

Kawungan State School opened on 29 January 1991.

In the  Kawungan had a population of 4,816 people.

Heritage listings
Kawungan has a number of heritage-listed sites, including:
 125 Doolong Road: Colonsay Farm (former Doolong Farm)

Education 
Kawungan State School is a government primary (Early Childhood-6) school for boys and girls at Grevillea Street. In 2018, the school had an enrolment of 897 students with 73 teachers (64 full-time equivalent) and 44 non-teaching staff (28 full-time equivalent). It includes a special education program.

Hervey Bay Special School is a special primary and secondary (Prep-12) school for boys and girls at 23 Frangipanni Avenue. In 2018, the school had an enrolment of 106 students with 29 teachers (28 full-time equivalent) and 37 non-teaching staff (24 full-time equivalent).

There are no secondary schools in the suburb. The nearest secondary schools are Hervey Bay State High School in neighbouring Pialba to the north-west and Urangan State High School in Urangan to the east.

Amenities 
There are a number of parks in the area, including:

 Areca Drive Park
 Arlington Court Park

 Cromdale Circuit Park

 Daydream Court

 Denmans Camp Road

 Lilley Park

 Low Park

 Mackay Drive Park

 Margaret Lin Park

 Meledie Ave Park

 Nelsley Court Park

 Oleander Ave Park
Baycrest retirement village is at 99 Doolong Road. It includes the Baycrest RSL aged care facility.

A chapel of the Church of Jesus Christ of Latter-day Saints is at 29 Grevillea Road.

References

External links 

Suburbs of Hervey Bay
Fraser Coast Region